The 39th annual Toronto International Film Festival, the 39th event in the Toronto International Film Festival series,  was held in Canada from 4–14 September 2014. David Dobkin's film The Judge, starring Robert Downey Jr. and Robert Duvall was the opening night film. A Little Chaos, a British period drama directed by Alan Rickman and starring Kate Winslet closed the festival. More films for each section were announced on 12 August, with the line-up completed on 19 August. A total of 393 films were shown, including 143 world premieres. The first Friday was dubbed "Bill Murray Day", as festival organisers dedicated a day to the actor by screening a select number of his films for free.

Awards

Programmes

Gala Presentations
Black and White by Mike Binder
Boychoir by François Girard
The Connection by Cedric Jimenez
The Equalizer by Antoine Fuqua
Escobar: Paradise Lost by Andrea Di Stefano
The Forger by Philip Martin
Foxcatcher by Bennett Miller
Haemoo by Shim Sung-bo
Infinitely Polar Bear by Maya Forbes
The Judge by David Dobkin
Laggies by Lynn Shelton
A Little Chaos by Alan Rickman
Maps to the Stars by David Cronenberg
The New Girlfriend by François Ozon
Pawn Sacrifice by Ed Zwick
The Riot Club by Lone Scherfig
Ruth & Alex by Richard Loncraine
Samba by Olivier Nakache and Eric Toledano
This is Where I Leave You by Shawn Levy
Wild by Jean-Marc Vallée

Special Presentations
99 Homes by Ramin Bahrani
American Heist by Sarik Andreasyan
Before We Go by Chris Evans
Beyond the Lights by Gina Prince-Bythewood
Breakup Buddies by Ning Hao
Cake by Daniel Barnz
Clouds of Sils Maria by Olivier Assayas
The Cobbler by Tom McCarthy
Coming Home by Zhang Yimou
The Dead Lands by Toa Fraser
Dearest by Peter Ho-Sun Chan
Don't Go Breaking My Heart 2 by Johnnie To
The Drop by Michaël R. Roskam
Eden by Mia Hansen-Løve
Elephant Song by Charles Binamé
An Eye for Beauty by Denys Arcand
Far from Men by David Oelhoffen
Force Majeure by Ruben Östlund
The Gate by Régis Wargnier
Gemma Bovery by Anne Fontaine
Gentlemen by Mikael Marcimain
Gomorrah by Stefano Sollima
Good Kill by Andrew Niccol
The Good Lie by Philippe Falardeau
Hector and the Search for Happiness by Peter Chelsom
Human Highway by Bernard Shakey and Dean Stockwell
The Humbling by Barry Levinson
Hungry Hearts by Saverio Costanzo
The Imitation Game by Morten Tyldum
Kahlil Gibran's The Prophet by Roger Allers, Gaëtan Brizzi, Paul Brizzi, Joan C. Gratz, Mohammed Saeed Harib, Tomm Moore, Nina Paley, Bill Plympton, Joann Sfar and Michal Socha
The Keeping Room by Daniel Barber
The Last Five Years by Richard LaGravenese
Learning to Drive by Isabel Coixet
Love and Mercy by Bill Pohlad
Madame Bovary by Sophie Bates
Manglehorn by David Gordon Green
Mary Kom by Omung Kumar
Men, Women and Children by Jason Reitman
Miss Julie by Liv Ullmann
Mommy by Xavier Dolan
Mr. Turner by Mike Leigh
My Old Lady by Israel Horovitz
Ned Rifle by Hal Hartley
Nightcrawler by Dan Gilroy
October Gale by Ruba Nadda
Pasolini by Abel Ferrara
Phoenix by Christian Petzold
Preggoland by Jacob Tierney
Pride by Matthew Warchus
The Reach by Jean-Baptiste Leonetti
Red Amnesia by Wang Xiaoshuai
Return to Ithaca by Laurent Cantet
Revenge of the Green Dragons by Andrew Lau and Andrew Loo
Roger Waters: The Wall by Sean Evans and Roger Waters
Rosewater by Jon Stewart
The Search by Michel Hazanavicius
A Second Chance by Susanne Bier
Shelter by Paul Bettany
The Sound and the Fury by James Franco
St. Vincent by Theodore Melfi
Still Alice by Richard Glatzer, Wash Westmoreland
The Theory of Everything by James Marsh
Three Hearts by Benoît Jacquot
Time Out of Mind by Oren Moverman
Top Five by Chris Rock
Two Days, One Night by Luc Dardenne and Jean-Pierre Dardenne
Welcome to Me by Shira Piven
While We're Young by Noah Baumbach
Whiplash by Damien Chazelle
Wild Tales by Damián Szifron

TIFF Docs
Beats of the Antonov by Hajooj Kuka
I Am Here by Lixin Fan
Iraqi Odyssey by Samir 
Merchants of Doubt by Robert Kenner 
National Diploma by Dieudo Hamadi 
National Gallery by Frederick Wiseman 
Natural Resistance by Jonathan Nossiter 
The Price We Pay by Harold Crooks
Red Army by Gabe Polsky 
Seymour: An Introduction by Ethan Hawke 
Silvered Water, Syria Self-Portrait by Ossama Mohammed and Wiam Simav Bedirxan
Sunshine Superman by Marah Strauch
Tales of the Grim Sleeper by Nick Broomfield
The Look of Silence by Joshua Oppenheimer
This Is My Land by Tamara Erde
The Yes Men Are Revolting by Laura Nix and The Yes Men
Roger & Me by Michael Moore
The Wanted 18 by Amer Shomali and Paul Cowan

Masters
1001 Grams by Bent Hamer
A Pigeon Sat on a Branch Reflecting on Existence by Roy Andersson
The Face of an Angel by Michael Winterbottom
Foreign Body by Krzysztof Zanussi
The Golden Era by Ann Hui
Goodbye to Language by Jean-Luc Godard
Hill of Freedom by Hong Sang-soo
Leviathan by Andrey Zvyagintsev
Murder in Pacot by Raoul Peck
Revivre by Im Kwon-taek
The Tale of Princess Kaguya by Isao Takahata
Timbuktu by Abderrahmane Sissako
Trick or Treaty? by Alanis Obomsawin
Winter Sleep by Nuri Bilge Ceylan

Midnight Madness
[REC]4 Apocalypse by Jaume Balagueró
Big Game by Jalmari Helander
Cub by Jonas Govaerts
The Editor by Adam Brooks and Matthew Kennedy
Electric Boogaloo: The Wild, Untold Story of Cannon Films by Mark Hartley
The Guest by Adam Wingard
It Follows by David Robert Mitchell
Tokyo Tribe by Sion Sono
Tusk by Kevin Smith
What We Do in the Shadows by Taika Waititi and Jemaine Clement

Vanguard
Alleluia by Fabrice Du Welz 
The Duke of Burgundy by Peter Strickland 
Goodnight Mommy by Veronika Franz and Severin Fiala
Hyena by Gerard Johnson 
Luna by Dave McKean 
Over Your Dead Body by Takashi Miike 
Shrew's Nest by Juanfer Andrés and Esteban Roel 
Spring by Justin Benson and Aaron Moorhead
They Have Escaped by JP Valkeapää 
The Voices by Marjane Satrapi
Waste Land by Pieter Van Hees 
The World of Kanako by Tetsuya Nakashima

Contemporary World Cinema
Aire libre by Anahí Berneri
Amour Fou by Jessica Hausner
Behavior by Ernesto Daranas
Bird People by Pascale Ferran
Black Souls by Francesco Munzi
Breathe by Mélanie Laurent
Charlie's Country by Rolf de Heer
Cut Bank by Matt Shakman
Cut Snake by Tony Ayres
The Dark Horse by James Napier Robertson
Don't Breathe by Nino Kirtadze
The Farewell Party by Sharon Maymon, Tal Granit
Felix and Meira by Maxime Giroux
Frailer by Mijke de Jong
Gett: The Trial of Viviane Amsalem by Ronit Elkabetz, Shlomi Elkabetz
Girlhood by Céline Sciamma
The Grump by Dome Karukoski
Heartbeat by Andrea Dorfman
High Society by Julie Lopes Curval
Impunity by Jyoti Mistry
In the Crosswind by Martti Helde
Itsi Bitsi by Ole Christian Madsen
Justice by Joel Lamangan
Kabukicho Love Hotel by Ryūichi Hiroki
Kill Me Three Times by Kriv Stenders
Labyrinth of Lies by Giulio Ricciarelli
Leopardi by Mario Martone
The Lesson by Kristina Grozeva, Petar Valchanov
Li'l Quinquin by Bruno Dumont
Love in the Time of Civil War by Rodrigue Jean
Lulu by Luis Ortega
Margarita, with a Straw by Shonali Bose
Meet Me in Montenegro by Alex Holdridge, Linnea Saasen
Men Who Save the World by Liew Seng Tat
Mirage by Szabolcs Hajdu
Modris by Juris Kursietis
Not My Type by Lucas Belvaux
Out of Nature by Ole Giæver
The Owners by Adilkhan Yerzhanov
Partners in Crime by Chang Jung-Chi
The Reaper by Zvonimir Jurić
Red Rose by Sepideh Farsi
Sand Dollars by Laura Amelia Guzmán, Israel Cárdenas
Still the Water by Naomi Kawase
Tales by Rakhshan Bani-E'temad
Teen Lust by Blaine Thurier
Tigers by Danis Tanovic
Today by Reza Mirkarimi
Tokyo Fiancée by Stefan Liberski
Tour de Force by Christian Zübert
Two Shots Fired by Martín Rejtman
The Valley by Ghassan Salhab
Venice by Kiki Álvarez
Voice Over by Cristián Jiménez
Where I Am King by Carlos Siguion-Reyna
Who Am I – No System Is Safe by Baran bo Odar
Xenia by Panos H. Koutras
You're Sleeping Nicole by Stéphane Lafleur

Short Cuts Canada
42 short films were presented as part of Short Cuts Canada in 2014:

 An Apartment — Sarah Galea-Davis
 Around Is Around — Norman McLaren
 The Barnhouse (La Grange) — Caroline Mailloux
 Bison — Kevan Funk
 Broken Face (Sale gueule) — Alain Fournier
 Burnt Grass — Ray Wong
 Chainreaction — Dana Gingras
 Chamber Drama — Jeffrey Zablotny
 CODA — Denis Poulin, Martine Époque
 Day 40 — Sol Friedman
 Del Ciego Desert — François Leduc
 A Delusion of Grandeur (Une idée de grandeur) — Vincent Biron
 The Encounter (La Rencontre) — Frieda Luk
 Entangled — Tony Elliott
 Father — Jordan Tannahill
 Fire (Fuoco) — Raha Shirazi
 Godhead — Connor Gaston
 Hole — Martin Edralin
 Indigo — Amanda Strong 
 Intruders — Santiago Menghini
 Kajutaijuq: The Spirit That Comes — Scott Brachmayer
 Last Night — Arlen Konopaki
 Light — Yassmina Karajah 
 Liompa — Elizabeth Lazebnik
 Luk'Luk'I: Mother — Wayne Wapeemukwa
 Me and My Moulton — Torill Kove
 Migration — Mark Lomond, Johanne Ste-Marie
 Mynarski Death Plummet (Mynarski chute mortel) — Matthew Rankin
 O Canada — Evelyn Lambart
 On Cement (Sur le ciment) — Robin Aubert
 Red Alert — Barry Avrich
 Running Season — Grayson Moore
 Sahar — Alexander Farah
 The Sands (Plage de sable) — Marie-Ève Juste
 Sleeping Giant — Andrew Cividino
 Still — Slater Jewell-Kemker
 Take Me (Prends-moi) — André Turpin, Anaïs Barbeau-Lavalette
 A Tomb with a View —  Ryan J. Noth
 The Underground — Michelle Latimer
 The Weatherman and the Shadowboxer — Randall Okita
 What Doesn't Kill You — Rob Grant
 Zero Recognition — Ben Lewis

Discovery
 '71 by Yann Demange
 Adult Beginners by Ross Katz
 Atlantic by Jan-Willem van Ewijk
 Backcountry by Adam MacDonald
 Bang Bang Baby by Jeffrey St. Jules
 Big Muddy by Jefferson Moneo
 Corbo by Mathieu Denis
 The Crow's Egg by M. Manikandan
 Dukhtar by Afia Nathaniel
 Flapping in the Middle of Nowhere by Nguyen Hoang Diep
 The Great Man by Sarah Leonor
 Guidance by Pat Mills
 I Am Not Lorena by Isidora Marras
 In Her Place by Albert Shin
 The Intruder by Shariff Korver
 La Salada by Juan Martin Hsu
 Life in a Fishbowl by Baldvin Zophoniasson
 The Little Death by Josh Lawson
 Los Hongos by Oscar Ruiz Navia
 Magical Girl by Carlos Vermut
 Mardan by Batin Ghobadi
 May Allah Bless France! by Abd al Malik
 The Narrow Frame of Midnight by Tala Hadid
 Obra by Gregorio Graziosi
 Red Alert by Barry Avrich
 Run by Philippe Lacote
 Second Coming by Debbie Tucker Green
 Without Pity by Michele Alhaique
 Songs She Wrote About People She Knows by Kris Elgstrand
 Stories of Our Lives by Jim Chuchu and The Nest Collective
 Sway by Rooth Tang
 Theeb by Naji Abu Nowar
 The Tribe by Myroslav Slaboshpytskiy
 Unlucky Plaza by Ken Kwek
 The Valley Below by Kyle Thomas
 The Vanished Elephant by Javier Fuentes-León
 Villa Touma by Suha Arraf
 We Were Wolves by Jordan Canning
 Wet Bum by Lindsay MacKay
 X+Y by Morgan Matthews

City to City: Seoul 
 Alive by Park Jung-bum
 Cart by Boo Ji-Young
 Confession by Lee Do-yun
 A Dream of Iron by Kelvin Kyung Kun Park
 A Girl at My Door by July Jung
 Gyeongju by Zhang Lu
 A Hard Day by Kim Seong-hun
 Scarlet Innocence by Yim Pil-sung

Canada's Top Ten
In December, TIFF programmers released their annual Canada's Top Ten list of the films selected as the ten best Canadian films of 2014. The selected films received a follow-up screening at the TIFF Bell Lightbox as a "Canada's Top Ten" minifestival in January 2015.

Features

Short films

References

External links

 Official site
 2014 Toronto International Film Festival at IMDb

2014
2014 film festivals
2014 in Toronto
2014 in Canadian cinema
2014 festivals in North America